Phavaraea rectangularis is a moth of the family Notodontidae first described by Hervé de Toulgoët in 1997. It is only known from French Guiana.

External links
"Phavaraea rectangularis (Toulgoët & Navatte 1997)". Tree of Life Web Project. Retrieved January 1, 2018.

Notodontidae of South America
Moths described in 1997